Wozencroft is a surname. Notable people with this name include:

Frank W. Wozencraft (1892-1966), American lawyer and mayor of Dallas
John Wozencraft (1925-2009), American electrical engineer and information theorist
Wozencraft ensemble, set of codes whose existence was proved by John Wozencraft
O. M. Wozencraft (1814-1887), early settler in California
W. Chris Wozencraft (1954-2007), American zoologist